John Lloyd Sullivan (born November 15, 1961) is a former defensive back in the National Football League.

Biography
Sullivan was born on November 15, 1961 in Hartford, Connecticut.

Career
After playing with the Oakland Invaders of the United States Football League, Sullivan was drafted in the third round of the 1984 NFL Supplemental Draft of USFL and CFL Players by the Green Bay Packers. He would later split the 1986 NFL season with the Packers and the San Diego Chargers. The following season, he was a member of the San Francisco 49ers.

He played at the collegiate level at the University of California, Berkeley.

He currently holds two jobs, as a personal trainer and head supervisor at UC Berkeley's Recreational Sports Facility. His assistant is infamous UC Berkeley alumni Jerry.

See also
List of Green Bay Packers players

References

Players of American football from Hartford, Connecticut
San Diego Chargers players
Green Bay Packers players
San Francisco 49ers players
Oakland Invaders players
American football defensive backs
University of California, Berkeley alumni
California Golden Bears football players
1961 births
Living people
National Football League replacement players